Cook is a village in Johnson County, Nebraska, United States. The population was 323 at the 2020 census.

History
Cook was founded in 1888 when the Missouri Pacific Railroad was extended to that point. It was named for Andrew Cook, the original owner of the town site.

Geography
Cook is located at  (40.510526, -96.161506).

Demographics

2010 census
At the 2010 census, of 2010, there were 321 people, 145 households and 89 families residing in the village. The racial makeup of the village was 95.0% White, 1.2% Asian, 2.2% from other races, and 1.6% from two or more races. Hispanic or Latino of any race were 3.1% of the population.

There were 145 households, of which 26.9% had children under the age of 18, 47.6% were married couples living together, 10.3% had a female householder with no husband present, 3.4% had a male householder with no wife present, and 38.6% were non-families. 34.5% of all households were made up of individuals, and 13.8% had someone living alone who was 65 years of age or older. The average household size was 2.21 and the average family size was 2.80.

The median age was 44.4 years. 23.7% of residents were under the age of 18; 8.8% were between the ages of 18 and 24; 18.3% were from 25 to 44; 31.1% were from 45 to 64; and 18.1% were 65 years of age or older. The sex makeup of the village was 47.7% male and 52.3% female.

2000 census
At the 2000 census, there were 322 people, 159 households and 86 families residing in the village. The population density was 1,854.9 per square mile (731.3/km). There were 175 housing units at an average density of 1,008.1 per square mile (397.5/km). The racial makeup of the village was 99.38% White, 0.31% Native American, and 0.31% from two or more races. Hispanic or Latino of any race were 1.24% of the population.

There were 159 households, of which 20.8% had children under the age of 18, 47.8% were married couples living together, 5.0% had a female householder with no husband present, and 45.3% were non-families. 42.1% of all households were made up of individuals, and 28.3% had someone living alone who was 65 years of age or older. The average household size was 2.03 and the average family size was 2.80.

18.9% of the population were under the age of 18, 5.6% from 18 to 24, 19.6% from 25 to 44, 24.8% from 45 to 64, and 31.1% who were 65 years of age or older. The median age was 48 years. For every 100 females, there were 76.0 males. For every 100 females age 18 and over, there were 75.2 males.

The median household income was $28,594 and the median family income was $34,545. Males had a median income of $29,750 and females $18,750. The per capita income was $18,204. About 2.2% of families and 6.8% of the population were below the poverty line, including none of those under age 18 and 20.8% of those age 65 or over.

Education
Cook is in  Johnson County Central Public Schools.

Cook was formerly in Nemaha Valley Schools. In 2007 Nemaha Valley merged into Johnson County Central Public Schools.

References

Villages in Johnson County, Nebraska
Villages in Nebraska